Scott L. Gunderson (born October 24, 1956) is a Wisconsin farmer, state legislator, and former small business owner.

Background 
Born in Burlington, Wisconsin, Gunderson graduated from Waterford Union High School in 1974. He owns a farm in the Town of Norway, and from 1980-2007 operated Gundy's Sport, a company in Wind Lake which sold guns and other hunting and fishing supplies and equipment. He is a Lutheran; and is married to Lisa Gunderson. They have three children: Joshua, Hannah, and Rebecca.

Political career
From 1991-1995, Gunderson served on the Waterford Town Board. In 1994, he was elected to the Wisconsin State Assembly as a Republican from the 83rd Assembly district. He was a member of the Administrative Rules, Fish and Wildlife, and Natural Resources committees; and serves on the Wisconsin Coastal Management Council (1996–present) and Wisconsin State Fair Park board (2000–2011). In January 2011, Gunderson resigned from the Assembly to become the Executive Assistant in the Wisconsin Department of Natural Resources.

Ethics accusation
Gunderson has sponsored bills to lower the hunting age in Wisconsin to eight and to allow people to carry concealed handguns. In 2005, he refused to turn over a draft of concealed carry legislation on the grounds that draft bills are confidential, even though he had previously shown the draft to lobbyists for the National Rifle Association to solicit their feedback. The state Ethics Board ruled in 2006 that Gunderson as owner of Gundy's Sport didn't have enough of a financial interest in gun-related proposals to have a conflict. He said his store would not directly benefit from the legislation, and had sold fewer than 50 guns in the prior year.

Residency dispute
In 2006, Gunderson's Democratic opponent filed a charge that Gunderson did not live in the 83rd Assembly District, which he was elected to represent, and that he was violating election laws by voting in the Village of Waterford. Gunderson acknowledged that his farm and farmhouse is in the 63rd District; but points out that he has an apartment in Waterford, which has been his official address and voting residence for some time. When his Norway farm home was redistricted out of the 83rd district, he had told the Milwaukee Journal Sentinel that he would be moving to a new home inside the district. The Racine County District Attorney refused to file charges, and Gunderson was re-elected despite the challenge.

References

External links
Profile of Gunderson at Project Vote Smart
Wisconsin Democracy Campaign. "Campaign 2008: Big Money Contributors and PAC and Political Committee Contributions to: Scott Gunderson (R) - Assembly District 83: Contributors of $100 or more: January 1, 2007 through August 25, 2008

Republican Party members of the Wisconsin State Assembly
Living people
1956 births
People from Burlington, Wisconsin
American Lutherans
21st-century American politicians
People from Waterford, Wisconsin
People from Norway, Wisconsin